The name common crayfish may refer to different species in different places:
Astacus astacus, in Europe
Cambarus bartonii, in North America
Sagmariasus, in Australasia

Animal common name disambiguation pages